Francis Kelly may refer to:

Politicians
Francis Kelly (Australian politician) (1893–1980), New South Wales politician
Francis Kelly (Canadian politician) (1803–1879), Canadian surveyor and politician
Francis Kelly (New Zealand politician) (1883–1977), member of the New Zealand Legislative Council
Francis E. Kelly (1903–1982), 53rd Lieutenant Governor of Massachusetts, United States

Others
Francis Kelly (Medal of Honor) (1860–1938), U.S. Navy sailor in the Spanish–American War
Francis Martin Kelly (1886–1950), third Roman Catholic bishop of the Diocese of Winona
Francis Kelly (bishop of Derry), Irish prelate of the Roman Catholic Church
Francis Kelly (British Army officer) (1859–1937), British Army general
Francis Robert Kelly (1927-2012) American artist, printmaker, art restorer and author
Francis P. Kelly English architectural historian

See also
Francis Kelley (1870–1948), second Roman Catholic Bishop of Oklahoma, United States
Frank Kelly (disambiguation)